Aethalopteryx grandiplaga is a moth in the family Cossidae. It is found in the Central African Republic and the Democratic Republic of the Congo.

References

Moths described in 1930
Aethalopteryx